Karachiya is a census town in Vadodara district in the Indian state of Gujarat.

Demographics
 India census, Karachiya had a population of 7732. Males constitute 56% of the population and females 44%. Karachiya has an average literacy rate of 72%, higher than the national average of 59.5%: male literacy is 80%, and female literacy is 61%. In Karachiya, 12% of the population is under 6 years of age.

References

Cities and towns in Vadodara district